

Eberhard Wolfram (24 July 1882 – 6 January 1947) was a Vizeadmiral with the Kriegsmarine of Nazi Germany. He was a recipient of the Knight's Cross of the Iron Cross.

Awards
 Iron Cross (1914)  2nd Class (21 September 1914) & 1st Class (18 September 1915)
 Knight's Cross of the House Order of Hohenzollern with Swords (14 February 1919)
 Hanseatic Cross of Hamburg (1 August 1916)
 Service award (Prussia) (5 March 1922)
 Friedrich August Cross 1st Class (5 March 1922)
 Clasp to the Iron Cross (1939)  2nd Class (8 December 1939) & 1st Class (30 May 1940)
 Knight's Cross of the Iron Cross on 25 May 1941 as Konteradmiral and Befehshaber der Sicherung der Nordsee (Commander-in-Chief of the security North Sea)

References

Citations

Bibliography

 Dörr, Manfred (1996) (in German). Die Ritterkreuzträger der Überwasserstreitkräfte der Kriegsmarine—Band 2: L–Z. Osnabrück, Germany: Biblio Verlag. .
 

1882 births
1947 deaths
People from Mansfeld-Südharz
People from the Province of Saxony
Vice admirals of the Kriegsmarine
Imperial German Navy personnel of World War I
Counter admirals of the Reichsmarine
Recipients of the Knight's Cross of the Iron Cross
Recipients of the clasp to the Iron Cross, 1st class
Military personnel from Saxony-Anhalt